Pselliodidae is a family of small centipedes, identical and closely related to house centipedes.

Genera and species
, the Integrated Taxonomic Information System recognizes the following genera and species in Pselliodidae:

 Gonethella 
 Gonethella nesiotes 
 Gonethina 
Gonethina fijiana 
 Gonethina grenadensis 
 Sphendononema 
Sphendononema chagualensis 
Sphendononema guildingii 
Sphendononema rugosa 

In contrast,  wrote this family comprises "at least three species in a single genus", only mentioning the genus Sphendononema and the species S. guildingii and S. rugosa.

References

Further reading

 
 
 

Centipede families
Scutigeromorpha